Tegosa anieta, the black-bordered tegosa, is a species of butterfly in the genus Tegosa found from southern Mexico to South America.

Subspecies
Listed alphabetically:
T. a. anieta (Hewitson, 1864)
T. a. cluvia (Godman & Salvin, [1882])
T. a. lirina (Röber, 1913)
T. a. luka Higgins, 1981

References

Melitaeini
Nymphalidae of South America
Butterflies described in 1864
Taxa named by William Chapman Hewitson
Butterflies of North America